Valčík pro milión is a 1960 Czechoslovak film. The film starred Josef Kemr.

References

External links
 

1960 films
Czechoslovak romantic drama films
1960s Czech-language films
Czech romantic drama films
1960s Czech films